Beautiful History: A Hits Collection is the third compilation album by Christian singer Plumb. It contains re-recordings of three songs from her 1998 album candycoatedwaterdrops as well as singles from her later albums Beautiful Lumps of Coal, Chaotic Resolve and Blink. It also contains two new songs recorded for the album, "Hang On" and "Beautiful History." It peaked at No. 39 on Billboard's Christian Albums chart.

Track listing

Singles 
 "God-Shaped Hole (2010)" — No. 25 Hot Christian Songs
 "Hang On" — No. 1 Hot Dance Club Play
 "Beautiful History" — No. 22 Hot Christian Songs

References 

2009 compilation albums
Plumb (singer) compilation albums
Curb Records compilation albums